The Kargil War order of battle (KWORBAT), is a deposition and systematic combatant structure of the Indian Army troops and the unified Pakistan Armed Forces combat commands, active in the Kargil region in 1999, during the Kargil War. The Indian Army orbat is based on the publications provided by the Indian military authors, news media and official sources.

The Pakistan orbat is based on the intelligence information provided by the Pakistani media (both electronic and print media), military authors, and Pakistani documentaries made after the 1999 conflict. The Pakistan orbat does not include the separatist fighters who, were also involved in fighting atop the peaks of Kargil.

India
Indian Army infantry battalions were often transferred between brigade commands during the war, so sometimes appear under multiple brigades.

Indian Army
Northern Command
XV Corps
XV Corps Artillery Brigade
HQ 8 Mountain Division
Divisional Brigades
8 Mountain Artillery Brigade
56 Mountain Brigade (Matayan)
1st Battalion, Naga Regiment
2nd Battalion, 5th Gorkha Rifles
2nd Battalion, Rajputana Rifles
3rd Battalion, Rajputana Rifles
18th Battalion, Garhwal Rifles
13th Battalion, Jammu and Kashmir Rifles
1st Battalion, 3rd Gorkha Rifles
9th Battalion, Parachute Regiment Special Forces 
ATGM Detachment, 17th Battalion, Brigade of the Guards
192 Mountain Brigade
18th Battalion, The Grenadiers
8th Battalion, Sikh Regiment
9th Battalion, Para (Special Forces)
ATGM Detachment, 17th Battalion, Brigade of the Guards
Additional brigades
121 (Independent) Infantry Brigade
16th Battalion, The Grenadiers
4th Battalion, Jat Regiment
3rd Battalion, Punjab Regiment
10th Battalion, Garhwal Rifles
8th Battalion, Border Security Force
ATGM Detachment, 17th Battalion, Brigade of the Guards
50 (Independent) Parachute Brigade
6th Battalion, Parachute Regiment
7th Battalion, Parachute Regiment
1st Battalion, Parachute Regiment (Special Forces)
ATGM Detachment, 19th Battalion, Brigade of the Guards
79 Mountain Brigade  (XV Corps reserve)
17th Battalion, Jat Regiment
28th Battalion, Rashtriya Rifles
12th Battalion, Mahar Regiment
2nd Battalion, Naga Regiment
3rd Infantry Division
2 Engineer Regiment
3 Artillery Brigade
70 Infantry Brigade
1st Battalion, 11th Gorkha Rifles
12th Battalion, Jammu and Kashmir Light Infantry
10th Battalion, Parachute Regiment (Special Forces) 
1st Battalion, Bihar Regiment
Ladakh Scouts
17th Battalion, Garhwal Rifles
5th Battalion, Parachute Regiment
14th Battalion, Sikh Regiment
ATGM Detachment, 19th Battalion, Brigade of the Guards
102 (Independent) Infantry Brigade
11th Battalion, Rajputana Rifles
9th Battalion, Mahar Regiment
13th Battalion, Kumaon Regiment
27th Battalion, Rajput Regiment
High Altitude Warfare School Permanent Cadre Detachment
ATGM Detachment, 19th Battalion, Brigade of the Guards

Kargil Theatre Artillery 
These units took part in the war serving under various formations:
4 Field Regiment (now 4 Medium Regiment (Self Propelled))
15 Field Regiment (now 15 Medium Regiment) 
41 Field Regiment (now 41 Medium Regiment)
108 Medium Regiment (now 108 Field Regiment)
114 Medium Regiment
139 Medium Regiment
141 Field Regiment (now 141 Medium Regiment)
153 Medium Regiment (Self Propelled) 
158 Medium Regiment (Self Propelled)
197 Field Regiment  (now 197 Medium Regiment)
212 Rocket Regiment
244 Heavy Mortar Regiment (now 244 Field Regiment)
253 Medium Regiment
255 Field Regiment (now 255 Medium Regiment)
286 Medium Regiment (now 286 Field Regiment)
305 Medium Regiment (now 305 Field Regiment)
307 Medium Regiment
315 Field Regiment
1861 Light Regiment
1889 Light Regiment (now 1889 Missile Regiment)

Other battalions
5th Battalion, Special Frontier Force
663 Reconnaissance & Observation Squadron
668 Reconnaissance & Observation Squadron
13th Battalion, Punjab Regiment
12th Battalion, The Grenadiers
22nd Battalion, The Grenadiers
7th Battalion, Jat Regiment
14th Battalion, Sikh Light Infantry
9th Battalion, Rashtriya Rifles
14th Battalion, Rashtriya Rifles
17th Battalion, Rashtriya Rifles
11th Battalion, Sikh Regiment
3rd Battalion, Jammu and Kashmir Rifles
16th Battalion, Dogra Regiment
5th Battalion, Rajput Regiment
9th Battalion, Mahar Regiment

Indian Air Force
Apart from the involvement of the Indian Army, the Indian Air Force (IAF) also participated in the Kargil War as part of Operation Safed Sagar.

Pakistan
Initially, the Kargil order of battle was planned by the Directorate-General for Military Operations (DGMO), Brig. Gen. Nadeem Ahmed. However, after the IAF strike and Indian advancement in the region, the Pakistan Air Force and the Navy deployed and issued orders to their combat forces. Their missions were to conduct surveillance and air patrolling; no other combat units of PAF and Navy participated in the combat. The inter-services order of battle is mentioned in the table. According to the Pakistan news channels reports and military declassified information, the Kargil infiltration was comprehensively planned by the joint officers at the Joint staff Headquarters, a joint office secretariat which then-served under Gen. Pervez Musharraf.

From the start of the conflict, there were numerous inter-services meetings coordinated by the chairman joint chiefs, to Prime minister Nawaz Sharif. The controversy still surrounds in the military science circle of the Pakistan armed forces, with chief of naval staff and chief of air staff including key theatre commanders of army combatant corps, bringing up the accusations that the Kargil front was launched without their knowledge or confidence.

Pakistan Army
 5th Battalion, Northern Light Infantry Regiment
 6th Battalion, Northern Light Infantry Regiment
 12th Battalion, Northern Light Infantry Regiment
 13th Battalion, Northern Light Infantry Regiment
 24th Battalion, Sindh Regiment
 27th Battalion, Sindh Regiment

Pakistan Air Force
 Note: No PAF F-16s took active participation in the conflict. All PAF missions were to conduct combat air patrols in the area.
No. 38 Multirole Group
No. 9 Squadron Griffins and No. 11 Squadron Arrows.
The F-16s belonging to Griffins Arrows were deployed in the region. No F-16s took active participation in the conflict.

Pakistan Navy
Note: No Navy units took active participation. The Navy was on high-alert but strictly ordered by Admiral Bokhari not to escalate the crises into sea. Although, Navy had its own significance in the Kargil theatre, but no crucial operations and efforts were applied or undertaken by Navy to support the army. According to the chief of naval staff, General Pervez Musharraf, as chairman joint chiefs, had failed to take navy into confidence prior to the start of the conflict.
Pakistan Navy Commander Karachi
Pakistan Naval Air Arm
The Pakistan Navy, in a defensive mood, directed all its units to keep clear of Indian naval ships. As the exercise shifted closer to the Makaran Coast, Pakistan moved all its major combatants out of Karachi. The Navy remained on high-alert, although orders were not to escalate the crises to sea. The Navy launched surveillance operations; Karachi port remained on high-alert.

References

27 Sind

Sources
 Indian Army – Kargil War 1999 v.2.0 8 March 2006 Mandeep S. Bajwa & Ravi Rikhye
 Kargil Committee Report Executive Summary

Kargil War
Pakistan Air Force
Pakistan Army
Naval operations involving Pakistan
Nawaz Sharif administration
1999 in Pakistan
Controversies in Pakistan
Government of Pakistan secrecy
Orders of battle